Freya Aelbrecht (born 10 February 1990) is a Belgian female volleyball player, playing as a middle-blocker. She is part of the Belgium women's national volleyball team.

She competed at the 2015 European Games and 2015 Women's European Volleyball Championship. On club level she plays for FV Busto Arsizio, and at the 2015 FIVB Volleyball World Grand Prix.

References

External links

1990 births
Living people
Belgian women's volleyball players
Place of birth missing (living people)
Volleyball players at the 2015 European Games
European Games competitors for Belgium
Middle blockers
21st-century Belgian women